The Sports Association for Adelaide Schools (formerly the Independent Schools Sports Association of South Australia or ISSA) is a group of schools in South Australia involved in sporting and cultural activities.

Controversy 
The football competition came to media attention in March 2011 when it was reported that schools were offering scholarships to lure the top footballers from rival schools since the introduction of premiership tables.  The scholarships ensured the players were obliged to play for their schools, rather than within the SANFL, the peak football competition in South Australia.

This issue came to further media attention in August 2013 when it was reported that Cory Gregson, a player within the Sacred Heart first XVIII was not permitted to make his League debut with the Glenelg Football Club due to being a required player for his school team.

Current member schools 
The current members of SAAS are:

Sports
Sports which are currently part of the program:
Badminton
Basketball
Cricket
Cross country running
Football
Hockey
Soccer
Swimming
Tee Ball
Table tennis
Tennis
Volleyball
Water polo

See also 
 List of schools in South Australia
 Independent Girls' Schools Sports Association (South Australia)

References

External links 
 Sports Association for Adelaide Schools

Australian school sports associations
Sport in Adelaide